Israel "Cisco" Oliver (born December 28, 1947) is a retired American professional basketball player.

Oliver stood 6'6" tall and weighed 210 lbs. He played for Elizabeth City State University and was drafted by the Portland Trail Blazers in the tenth round of the 1970 NBA draft. He later played in the very first season of Asia's first professional basketball league, the Philippine Basketball Association during its inaugural season in 1975 with the Mariwasa-Noritake Porcelain makers. Oliver spent three more seasons in the PBA with two teams, also playing for Presto/Great Taste in his final year in 1978, and appeared in TV commercials.

PBA Career stats

References
PBA celebrates 35th anniversary
PBA Season One: 1975 @ Philippinebasketball.ph

1947 births
Living people
American expatriate basketball people in the Philippines
Elizabeth City State Vikings basketball players
Forwards (basketball)
Philippine Basketball Association imports
Portland Trail Blazers draft picks
Basketball players from Norfolk, Virginia
American men's basketball players
Great Taste Coffee Makers players